North Central Arizona is a geographical region of Arizona. It is in the Transition Zone between the Basin and Range Province and the Colorado Plateau, and has some of the most rugged and scenic landscapes in Arizona.

As part of the southern Colorado Plateau (Mogollon Plateau) it has an average elevation of 4,000–5,000 feet.

Physiographic Features
 Mogollon Rim
 San Francisco Volcanic Field
 Humphrey's Peak, the highest peak in Arizona at 12,633 feet.
 Barringer Crater ( Meteor Crater)
 Mormon Lake
 Oak Creek Canyon
 Verde Valley
 Mingus Mountain, (Black Hills (Arizona))
 Verde Rim
 Red Rock Country; see Sedona and Village of Oak Creek, Arizona
 Bradshaw Mountains
 Granite Mountain (Arizona)
 Little Colorado River
 Fossil Creek Canyon

National Monuments:
 Wupatki
 Sunset Crater
 Walnut Canyon
 Montezuma Castle
 Tuzigoot

Arizona State Parks
 Riordan Mansion
 Slide Rock
 Red Rock
 Dead Horse Ranch
 Jerome
 Fort Verde
 Tonto Natural Bridge

Cities/Towns:
 Williams, Arizona
 Flagstaff, Arizona
 Sedona, Arizona
 Village of Oak Creek, Arizona
 Jerome, Arizona
 Ash Fork, Arizona
 Paulden, Arizona
 Chino Valley, Arizona
 Prescott, Arizona
 Humboldt, Arizona
 Dewey, Arizona
 Mayer, Arizona
 Spring Valley, Arizona
 Cordes Lakes, Arizona
 Cottonwood, Arizona
 Camp Verde, Arizona
 Clarkdale, Arizona
 Cornville, Arizona
 Lake Montezuma, Arizona
 Payson, Arizona
 Strawberry, Arizona
 Pine, Arizona
 Pinetop-Lakeside, Arizona
 Show Low, Arizona

Geography of Arizona
Geography of Yavapai County, Arizona
Geography of Coconino County, Arizona